Katharina Buchwieser (24 May 1789 – 9 July 1828) was a German operatic soprano and actress. She was known as Cathinka, and her married surname was Lacsny von Folkusfálva. She appeared at theatres of Vienna, the Theater an der Wien and the Theater am Kärntnertor, then the court theatre. Franz Schubert dedicated compositions to her.

Career 
Born in Koblenz, the daughter of the composer and Kapellmeister Balthasar Buchwieser, she made her debut in 1802 at the Frankfurt Opera as Myrrha in Peter von Winter's Das unterbrochene Opferfest. She certainly sang there in the 1803-04 season. In 1806, she moved to Vienna, where her father became Kapellmeister at the Theater an der Wien. She first appeared at the theatre on 6 December that year as Sesto in Mozart's La clemenza di Tito.

She performed regularly at the Kärntnertortheater from 1809. She appeared as the Princess of Navarra in Jean de Paris by François-Adrien Boieldieu in 1813 at the Theater an der Wien. In 1814, she appeared as Irene in Giacomo Meyerbeer's early opera Die beiden Kalifen. She performed as an actress, as it was customary in Vienna.

Her operatic roles included Mozart's Donna Elvira in Don Giovanni, the title roles of Ferdinando Paer's Achille, Camilla and Leonora, and the title role in Henri-Montan Berton's Aline, reine de Golconde. She retired from the stage in 1815, but still performed in concerts.

Hochwieser married Karl Joseph Graf von Hrzan in 1808. The marriage was annulled by the emperor in 1820 after Hrzan was accused of criminal actions. In 1821, she married Miklós Lacsny, an administrator of the estates of Count Ferdinánd Pálffy.

Franz Schubert probably knew her in connection to her former colleague Johann Michael Vogl, and met Johann Nepomuk Hummel and Ferdinand Hiller at soirées in her home, among others. He dedicated compositions to her, his Lieder after poems by Johann Mayrhofer, Op. 36, which is the second version of two songs, "Der zürnenden Diana" (To Diana in her wrath), D. 707, and "Nachtstück", D. 672, and his Divertissement à l'hongroise in G minor for piano duet, D. 818 (Op. 54).

Buchwieser died in Vienna.

Further reading 
 Drei Gedichte an Cathinka Buchwieser in: Adolf Bäuerle (ed.): Theater-Almanach. 1813
 Werner Bodendorff: Franz Schuberts Frauenbild, Augsburg 1996.
 Otto Erich Deutsch: Schubert Erinnerungen, Leipzig 1957.
 Otto Erich Deutsch: Schubert Dokumente, Kassel 1964.
 Ernst Hilmar: Schubert-Lexikon, Graz 1997.
 Clemens Höslinger: Schubert, Schwind und die Göttin Diana. Eine Erinnerung an die Sängerin Catinka Buchwieser. In: Schubert:Perspektiven. 10, pp. 45–69.
 Michael Jahn: Die Wiener Hofoper von 1794 bis 1810. Musik und Tanz im Burg- und Kärnthnerthortheater. RISM-Österreich B/11. Vienna 2011.
 Michael Jahn: Die Wiener Hofoper von 1810 bis 1836. Das Kärnthnerthortheater als Hofoper. RISM-Österreich B/6. Vienna 2007.

Notes

References

External links 
 

German operatic sopranos
19th-century German women opera singers
1789 births
1828 deaths
Musicians from Koblenz